Blainvillea is a genus of flowering plants in the family Asteraceae. They are native to tropical and subtropical regions of Africa, Australia, and Latin America.

They are annual or perennial herbs. The flower heads contain small ray florets with toothed tips, usually yellow, or occasionally white. The genus name honors French naturalist Henri Marie Ducrotay de Blainville.

 Species
The following species are recognised in the genus Blainvillea:

 Blainvillea acmella 
 Blainvillea calcicola
 Blainvillea cunninghamii
 Blainvillea dichotoma  - French Guiana
 Blainvillea gayana  - Africa from Egypt to Gambia and KwaZulu-Natal; Yemen, Cape Verde

References

Asteraceae genera
Heliantheae